My Friend the King is a 1932 British comedy film, directed by Michael Powell and starring Jerry Verno.  The film was a follow-up to Two Crowded Hours, Powell's unexpectedly popular directorial debut of the previous year, with comedian Verno reprising his role as a chirpy Cockney taxi driver who gets mixed up in shady doings.  This film however was less well-received, with Powell recalling it as "a complete failure", also noting that he worked on six films during 1932 and that "they couldn't all be good...and they weren't".

My Friend the King is one of eleven quota quickies directed by Powell between 1931 and 1936 of which no print is known to survive.  The film is not held in the BFI National Archive, and is classed as "missing, believed lost".

Plot
Taxi driver Jim (Verno) befriends Ruritanian child King Ludwig while the latter is on a visit to London.  A plot is afoot by sinister forces to kidnap Ludwig, and Jim becomes caught up in the drama.  After the child is abducted Jim uses all his ingenuity, including cross-dressing as a Countess and becoming involved in a car chase, to rescue him from his captors.

Cast
 Jerry Verno as Jim
 Robert Holmes as Captain Felz
 Tracy Holmes as Count Huelin
 Eric Pavitt as King Ludwig
 Phyllis Loring and Princess Helma
 Luli Deste as Countess Zena
 Harold Saxon-Snell as Karl
 Vicotor Fairley as Josef

Reception
Contemporary reviewers enjoyed Verno's performance but felt he was let down by the feeble material with which he had to work, with Bioscope commenting "a better vehicle really should have been devised for a comedian of such ability as Verno."  Picturegoer Weekly found: "There is not much subtlety about the burlesque, but it is presented with plenty of action...not great stuff this, but helps pass three-quarters of an hour quite pleasantly."

References

External links 
 
 
 

1932 films
1932 comedy films
Films directed by Michael Powell
Films by Powell and Pressburger
Lost British films
British black-and-white films
1930s English-language films
British comedy films
1932 lost films
1930s British films